Fabio Maj (born 16 June 1970 in Schilpario) is an Italian cross-country skier who competed from 1992 to 2004. He won two silver medals in the 4 × 10 km relay at the Winter Olympics (1998, 2002). He also finished 13th in the 10 km + 15 km combined pursuit at the 1998 Winter Olympics in Nagano and 13th in the 30 km event at the 2002 Winter Olympics in Salt Lake City which were his best individual Olympic finishes.

Maj also won two bronze medals in the 4 × 10 km relay at the Nordic skiing World Championships (1995, 1999). His best individual finish was seventh in the 30 km at the 2001 event.

Cross-country skiing results
All results are sourced from the International Ski Federation (FIS).

Olympic Games
 2 medals – (2 silver)

World Championships
 2 medals – (2 bronze)

World Cup

Season standings

Individual podiums
2 victories 
4 podiums

Team podiums

 6 victories – (4 , 2 ) 
 17 podiums – (15 , 2 )

Note:  Until the 1999 World Championships, World Championship races were included in the World Cup scoring system.

References

External links
 
 
 
 
 

1970 births
Living people
People from Schilpario
Italian male cross-country skiers
Cross-country skiers at the 1998 Winter Olympics
Cross-country skiers at the 2002 Winter Olympics
Olympic medalists in cross-country skiing
FIS Nordic World Ski Championships medalists in cross-country skiing
Medalists at the 2002 Winter Olympics
Medalists at the 1998 Winter Olympics
Olympic silver medalists for Italy
Sportspeople from the Province of Bergamo